The men's 200 metre freestyle competition of the swimming events at the 2015 World Aquatics Championships was held on 4 August with the heats and the semifinals on the 3 August.

British swimmer James Guy won the gold medal in a new National Record time of 1:45.14, holding off a strong charge from Asian Record holder Sun Yang (1:45.20). By winning, Guy continued his country's outstanding success in Kazan, and improved on his second place finish in the 400 meter freestyle. Meanwhile, World Record holder Paul Biedermann picked up the bronze medal in 1:45.38.  After leading throughout the beginning of the race, American Ryan Lochte ended the 200m with a fourth-place finish (1:45.83). Dutchman Sebastiaan Verschuren picked up fifth (1:45.91), while South Africa's Chad le Clos added the middle distance freestyle event to his already large repertoire, finishing sixth in 1:46.53. Russia's Aleksandr Krasnykh (1:46.88) and Australian Cameron McEvoy (1:47.26) rounded out the championship field.

Records
Prior to the competition, the existing world and championship records were as follows.

Results

Heats
The heats were held on 3 August at 10:27.

Semifinals
The semifinals were held on 3 August at 18.42.

Semifinal 1

Semifinal 2

Final

The final was held on 4 August at 17:32.

References

Men's 200 metre freestyle